This is a list of the presidents of Serbia, including the heads of state of the Socialist Republic of Serbia, a constituent state within the Socialist Federal Republic of Yugoslavia and heads of state of the Republic of Serbia (1992–2006), a constituent state within the Federal Republic of Yugoslavia / State Union of Serbia and Montenegro. Prior to 1974, Serbia's head of state was the speaker (president) of the Serbian parliament.

The President of the Republic (Predsednik Republike, Председник Републике) is directly elected to a five-year term and is limited by the Constitution to a maximum of two terms. In addition to being the Commander-in-chief of the Armed Forces, the President has the procedural duty of appointing the Prime Minister with the consent of the National Assembly, and has some influence on foreign policy. The President's office is located in Novi dvor.

Serbia within Yugoslavia / Serbia and Montenegro (1944–2006)

People's Republic of Serbia / Socialist Republic of Serbia

{| class="wikitable" style="text-align:center"
|-
! rowspan=2| 
! rowspan=2| Portrait
! width=30% rowspan=2| Name
! colspan=3| Term of office
! rowspan=2| Political Party
|-
! Took office
! Left office
! Time in office
|- align="center" 
| colspan=7| Chairman of the Anti-fascist Assembly for the National Liberation of Serbia (ASNOS)

|-align="center" 
| colspan=7| Presidents of the Presidium of the People's Assembly

|- align="center" 
| colspan=7| Presidents of the People's Assembly

|- align="center" 
| colspan=7| Presidents of the Presidency

Republic of Serbia

{| class="wikitable" style="text-align:center"
|-
! rowspan=2| 
! rowspan=2| Portrait
! width=30% rowspan=2| Name
! colspan=3| Term of office
! rowspan=2| Political Party
! rowspan=2| Elected
|-
! Took office
! Left office
! Time in office

Republic of Serbia (2006–present)
Serbia became independent on 5 June 2006.

{| class="wikitable" style="text-align:center"
|-
! rowspan=2| 
! rowspan=2| Portrait
! width=30% rowspan=2| Name
! colspan=3| Term of office
! rowspan=2| Political Party
! rowspan=2| Elected
|-
! Took office
! Left office
! Time in office

See also
List of Serbian monarchs
List of heads of state of Serbia, for a comprehensive list of Serbian heads of state since 1804
President of Serbia
President of the National Assembly of Serbia
Prime Minister of Serbia
President of Serbia and Montenegro
List of heads of state of Yugoslavia

Notes

References

External links

Official Web Site of The President of Serbia
People´s Office of the President

Serbia

Presidents